Spheterista cassia is a moth of the family Tortricidae. It was first described by Otto Swezey in 1912. It is endemic to the Hawaiian island of Oahu.

The larvae feed on Cassia gaudichaudii. They feed singly, eating the lower epidermis and parenchyma, leaving the upper epidermis. They fold together the leaflet with a web to create a hiding place, often along the midrib. Sometimes a portion of the margin of the blade is folded over, or contiguous leaflets are fastened together. Full-grown larvae are about 9 mm long and uniform leaf-green.

The pupa is formed in the larval retreat in a slight cocoon. It is about 5 mm long and greenish.

References

Archipini
Endemic moths of Hawaii